William Lyall may refer to:
 William Lyall (politician), Australian politician, member of the Victorian Legislative Assembly
 William Lyall (priest), English churchman
 William Lyall (businessman) Scottish–American merchant and businessman
 William John Campbell Lyall, Scottish rugby union player 
 Bill Lyall, Canadian politician, member of the Northwest Territories Legislative Assembly 
 Billy Lyall, Scottish musician